Kelly Catlin (November 3, 1995 – March 7, 2019) was an American professional racing cyclist who rode for UCI Women's Team . Catlin won gold medals in the women's team pursuit at the 2016, 2017, and 2018 UCI Track Cycling World Championships. She also won a silver medal in the same event at the 2016 Summer Olympics.

Biography
Catlin was born in St. Paul, Minnesota; she was a triplet, with a brother and sister. She earned a degree in mathematics and Chinese from the University of Minnesota, and was studying at Stanford University for a graduate degree in computational and mathematical engineering. In addition to her career as a professional road cyclist, Catlin was an artist and a violinist.

Catlin died on March 7, 2019, at Stanford University following an episode of depression. According to her sister, she committed suicide months after suffering a concussion due to a cycling accident. The university issued a statement saying that Catlin's roommate found her dead in her on-campus residence without any sign of foul play. Following her death, her family donated Catlin's brain to the Concussion Legacy Foundation Brain Bank at Boston University for further research into concussions.

Cycling
Catlin started cycling at age 17. She participated in the UCI Track Cycling World Championships three times and won gold medals in all of them. Catlin won gold medals in the women's team pursuit at the 2016, 2017, and 2018 UCI Track Cycling World Championships. She also won a silver medal in the same event at the 2016 Summer Olympics. She was a member of the women's team of Rally UHC Cycling.

Major results

2015

 2nd Individual pursuit, Independence Day Grand Prix
 2016
 1st  Team pursuit, UCI Track World Championships

 2nd Team pursuit, Olympic Games
2017
 UCI Track World Championships
1st  Team pursuit
3rd Individual pursuit 
2018
 UCI Track World Championships
1st  Team pursuit
3rd Individual pursuit
 2nd Criterium, National Road Championships

References

External links

Kelly Catlin: A family's search for answers on links between concussion and suicide (BBC December 16, 2021)

1995 births
2019 suicides
American female cyclists
American track cyclists
Cyclists at the 2015 Pan American Games
Cyclists at the 2016 Summer Olympics
Cyclists from Minnesota
Female suicides
Medalists at the 2016 Summer Olympics
Olympic silver medalists for the United States in cycling
Pan American Games medalists in cycling
Pan American Games silver medalists for the United States
Sportspeople from Saint Paul, Minnesota
Stanford University alumni
Suicides by asphyxiation
Suicides in California
Triplets
UCI Track Cycling World Champions (women)
University of Minnesota College of Liberal Arts alumni
Medalists at the 2015 Pan American Games
21st-century American women